Robert Lindstedt and Nenad Zimonjić were the defending champions but decided not to participate together.  Lindstedt played alongside Łukasz Kubot, but lost in the first round to Julien Benneteau and Édouard Roger-Vasselin.  Zimonjić teamed up with Daniel Nestor, but lost in the quarterfinals to Michaël Llodra and Nicolas Mahut.

Llodra and Mahut won the title, defeating Jean-Julien Rojer and Horia Tecău in the final, 6–2, 7–6(7–4).

Seeds

Draw

Draw

Qualifying

Seeds

Qualifiers
  Michael Berrer /  Sergiy Stakhovsky

Lucky losers
  James Cerretani /  Adil Shamasdin

Qualifying draw

External links
 2006 ABN AMRO World Tennis Tournament Doubles Main Draw

ABN AMRO World Tennis Tournament - Doubles
2014 ABN AMRO World Tennis Tournament